The 1981–82 Minnesota Golden Gophers men's basketball team represented the University of Minnesota as a member of the Big Ten Conference during the 1981–82 NCAA Division I men's basketball season. Led by head coach Jim Dutcher, the Gophers won the Big Ten title with a conference record of 14–4, and finished with an overall record of 23–6.

Roster

Schedule and results

|-
!colspan=9 style=| Non-Conference Regular season

|-
!colspan=9 style=| Big Ten Conference Regular season

|-
!colspan=9 style=| NCAA Tournament

Rankings

Team players in the 1982 NBA Draft

References

Minnesota Golden Gophers men's basketball seasons
Minnesota
Minnesota
1981 in sports in Minnesota
1982 in sports in Minnesota